The Roundhouse, formerly Corporation Wharf, is a crescent shaped building located in the city centre of Birmingham, England.

Originally used as a local authority depot, stables and stores the building is now in the care of Roundhouse Birmingham, an independent charity created by the National Trust and Canal and River Trust. Roundhouse Birmingham and their partners are currently repurposing the building, ready for a mix of lettings, and a year-round programme of walks and tours that will launch in 2021. The Roundhouse is a rare survival of a relatively unaltered 19th century complex of functionally related buildings dating from Birmingham's industrial and civic heyday.

The building is Grade II* listed.

History
A design competition was held by the Corporation of Birmingham in the early 1870s for a depot to be located between the Birmingham Canal and Sheepcote Street. The winning design was from Birmingham architect, William Henry Ward who was also responsible for designing many building in the city, amongst them Great Western Arcade in 1876. The crescent shaped building was constructed in 1873–1874 with the two gatehouse buildings fronting Sheepcote Street constructed in 1885.

Originally named Corporation Wharf the building was built as a local authority depot which took advantage of its strategic location adjacent to the Birmingham Canal and the large railway goods depot for the London and North Western Railway on the Stour Valley Line.

The site was arranged to create a highly secure internal storage environment and an external working environment for open air storage, horses and maintenance. The design allowed horse-drawn carts to pass from the lower level outer yard through the enclosed core, via a tunnel and ramp, for the purposes of loading and stock control.

The building was in use by the City of Birmingham Engineers Department until the 1980s when it became redundant and the site was subdivided and sold. The site was acquired by British Waterways (now Canal and River Trust) in 2001.

In 2017, the Canal and River Trust and National Trust secured enterprise funding from the National Lottery Heritage Fund to conserve and repurpose the building. The new look Roundhouse will house an enterprise hub containing a range of lettable spaces aimed at start-ups, cultural organisations and small businesses. Roundhouse Birmingham, a new enterprise and independent charity, will act as both custodians of the building, and operate a range of city tours and experiences from the site.

In 2022, a restaurant, Jonathans in the Roundhouse, opened on the refurbished site.

See also
Architecture of Birmingham

References

External links
 National Trust - Roundhouse

Buildings and structures in Birmingham, West Midlands